Nikbakht Noruz is an Afghan female actor, who played the lead role of Bakhtay a six-year-old girl in a French, Iranian feature film Buddha Collapsed out of Shame (2007) directed by Hana Makhmalbaf set in Bamyan, Afghanistan

See also 

 Buddha Collapsed out of Shame
 Hana Makhmalbaf

Notes

External links 
 Buddha Collapsed out of Shame on Makhmalbaf productions official site
 

Hazara artists
Afghan child actresses
Afghan film actresses
21st-century Afghan actresses
Living people
Hazara children
2000 births
People from Bamyan Province